Korea Muslim Federation (KMF) is a Muslim organization established in 1967 in South Korea. The KMF oversees the Korean Muslim Students Association and the Korea Institute for Islamic Culture. The federation also supports a madrasa for Qur'anic education.

History 
The organization was formed in 1966 and became registered as a judicial person in 1967 through the Korean Ministry of Culture and Information.

Activities and functions 
The focus of the organization is to manage the religious and community affairs of Korean Muslims, and to engage in charity and missionary work. The organization works on setting up missionary centers in major cities, developing existing mosques, and training imams. Information on Islam, local affairs and other relevant materials for Korean Muslims or the public are also made available.

See also
 Islam in Korea
 Christian Liberal Party

References

External links
 

1967 establishments in South Korea
Islam in South Korea
Islamic organizations established in 1967
Religious organizations based in South Korea